Mathugama is a semi urban town surrounded by mountains. It is an electorate of the Kalutara district, in Western Province, Sri Lanka.

Mathugama is part of the Pasdun Korale (meaning: county of the five yojanas), created when King Parakramabahu the Great drained the Kalu Ganga basin.

In the days of the State Council it comprised the present-day Agalawatta, Bulathsinhala and Matugama constituencies.

In 1946, it was divided into two, the eastern portion becoming Agalawatta (itself subdivided in 1960 by the creation of Bulathsinhala).

Since 1989 it has been an electoral division of the Kalutara District, not a constituency sending a member to parliament in its own right.

Members of State Council 
The constituency was represented in the State Council by:
 D. D. Athulathmudali - 1931-1936
 C. W. W. Kannangara - 1936-1947

Members of Parliament 

 Wilmot A. Perera - 1947-1956
 Daya T. Pasqual - 1956-1977
 Reginald Wijegunaratne -1977-1983
 Anil Munasinghe - 1983-1994
 Mahinda Samarasinghe - 1989 onwards
 Kumara Welgama - 1994 onwards
 Palitha Thewarapperuma - 2010 onwards

Geography
Bounded by: 
North - Kalu Ganga river
East - Bulathsinhala and Agalawatte electorates
South - Bentota Ganga river
West - Kalutara and Beruwala electorates.

Schools in Matugama
 Ananda Sastralaya National School (National School)
 C. W. W. Kannangara Central College (National School)
 St. Mary's College(National school)
 D. D. Athulathmudali Vidayalaya
 E. W. Adikaram Maha Vidyalaya
 Rathnaloka College (Semi-Government)
 Leeds International school

Transport 
Matugama is easily accessible via the Southern Expressway (Sri Lanka). The town is located about  eastward to the Dodangoda Interchange.

There are two access roads from Colombo-Galle main road at Katukurunda (in Kalutara) and Aluthgama.  Matugama is also accessible via Horana or Agalawatte.

Buses are the only form of public transportation in Matugama. 
Bus routes terminating at Matugama:

285 - Horana (via Bulathsinhala)
399 - Pitigala / Elpitiya
403 - Neluwa
408 - Aluthgama(via Yatadola)
428/2 - Gulawita (via Walallawita, Meegahathenna)
428 - Walallawita (via  Meegahathenna)
430 - Colombo via Nagoda Kalutara
430/1 - Kalutara
431 - Kudaligama
433 - Agalawatte / Baduraliya / Wathugedara 
435 - Pelawatta (via  Meegahathenna, Polgampala, Agalawatte )
441 - Aluthgama (via Dharga Town)
458 - Horana (via Neboda)
16 - Kandy 
16/15/87 - Jaffna
16/15 - Anuradapura
482 - Kalawana
437- Kelinkanda (via  Molkawa, Agalawatte )
428/1 - Avithawa (via Walallawita)
965/1 - Walallawita (via Gulawita, utumgama)
98/5 - Akkaraipattu, Monaragala 
99/5 - Badulla
18/42 - Nuwara Ealiya
22 - Ampara
4 - Puttalam

External links
Matugama Weather
Matugama Travel Guide
Matugama map

Near cities 

 Kalutara(20km)
 Horana(30km)

 
Electoral divisions in Sri Lanka
Populated places in Kalutara District